Goalball was an event contested at the 2016 Summer Paralympics''' in Rio de Janeiro.

Medallists

Qualifying
10 men's and 10 women's teams qualified for the Games.

Men

Women

Men's tournament

Competition format
The ten men's teams were divided into two equal groups for a single round robin group stage. The top four teams of each group advanced to the quarter finals. All matches in the second stage were knock-out format.

Group stage

Group A

Group B

Knock-out round

Women's tournament

Competition format
The ten women's teams were divided into two equal groups for a single round robin group stage. The top four teams of each group advanced to the quarter finals. All matches in the second stage were knock-out format.

The Algerian women's team did not show up in time for its matches against the United States or Israel. The team missed connecting flights in Rome after setting out from a training camp in Poland. There were suspicions of a boycott. The International Paralympic Committee's spokesman, Craig Spence, said: "They are still sticking to their story that they suffered the worst transport issues known to man. Whether we believe it is a question mark and we are looking into it." Their first two games were recorded as 10–0 walkover wins for the other team. The team of Algeria arrived in Rio on 11 September. Spence remarked: "Fingers crossed they can manage to travel from the (Athletes') Village to the goalball venue in less than six days."

Group stage

Group C

Group D

Knock-out round

References

 
2016
2016 Summer Paralympics events
2016 in goalball
Goalball in Brazil